Paired-like homeodomain 1 is a protein that in humans is encoded by the PITX1 gene.

Function 

This gene encodes a member of the RIEG/PITX homeobox family, which is in the bicoid class of homeodomain proteins. Members of this family are involved in organ development and left-right asymmetry. This protein acts as a transcriptional regulator involved in basal and hormone-regulated activity of prolactin.

Clinical relevance 

Mutations in this gene have been associated with autism, club foot and polydactyly in humans.

Genetic basis of pathologies 
Genomic rearrangements at the PITX1 locus are associated with Liebenberg syndrome. In PITX1 Liebenberg is associated with a translocation or deletions, which cause insert promoter groups into the PITX1 locus.  A missense mutation within the PITX1 locus is associated with the development of autosomal dominant clubfoot.

Interactions 

PITX1 has been shown to interact with Pituitary-specific positive transcription factor 1.

References

Further reading

External links 

 
 http://omim.org/entry/602149 at OMIM, holds the most up to date information on PITX1.
 https://ghr.nlm.nih.gov/gene/PITX1 at the NIH, has a summary on the effects of PITX1 mutations.

Transcription factors